NHL on CTV is the name of a former television program that broadcast National Hockey League games on the CTV Television Network.

Regular season coverage

CTV's involvement with the NHL began in the  season with a series of Wednesday-night regular season games. These were produced by the McLaren ad agency, which also produced the Saturday night Hockey Night in Canada games for the CBC. As was the case with the Saturday games, they were contests (usually at home) of the Montreal Canadiens, Toronto Maple Leafs, and after 1970, the Vancouver Canucks. CTV decided to pull out of midweek NHL coverage in 1975, opening the way for local TV stations in the three Canadian cities which had NHL clubs to carry mid-week telecasts of their hometown NHL clubs.

On March 16, 1966, CTV's coverage of the game between the Canadiens and Maple Leafs was frequently interrupted for news updates on the Gemini 8 space mission, which had run into serious trouble after being successfully launched that morning; when the game ended, CTV joined a simulcast of CBS News coverage in time for the capsule's re-entry and splashdown.

Ironically, CTV affiliate CFCF-TV in Montreal carried some local Canadiens' telecasts starting in the 1975–76 season.

CTV/Carling O'Keefe initially signed a contract well into the 1984–85 season.  As a result, they wanted to cram as many games as possible (beginning in February) in the brief window they had. 1985–86's coverage didn't begin until November, so to avoid conflicts with CTV's coverage of the Major League Baseball postseason.

While Molson continued to present Hockey Night in Canada on Saturday nights on the CBC, rival brewery Carling O'Keefe began airing Friday Night Hockey on CTV. This marked the first time in more than a decade that CBC was not the lone over-the-air network broadcaster of the National Hockey League in Canada.

The deal with CTV was arranged by the Quebec Nordiques (who were owned by Carling O'Keefe) and the 14 U.S.-based NHL clubs, who sought to break Molson's monopoly on NHL broadcasting in Canada.  All of CTV's regular season telecasts originated from Quebec City or the United States, as Molson shut them out of the other six Canadian buildings (as Carling did to them in Quebec City).

After the 1985–86 season, CTV decided to pull the plug on the venture. Their limited access to Canadian-based teams (other than Quebec, whose English-speaking fan base was quite small) translated into poor ratings. For the next two years, Carling O'Keefe retained their rights, and syndicated playoff telecasts on a chain of channels that would one day become the Global Television Network under the names Stanley Cup '87 and Stanley Cup '88, before a merger between the two breweries put an end to the competition.

Regular season schedules

1984–85

1985–86

Stanley Cup playoffs coverage
In , Dan Kelly and Ron Reusch called the Philadelphia-Quebec Wales Conference Final series. They also called three games at the Colisée in Quebec of the Montreal-Quebec Adams Division Final and Games 2 and 5 of the Philadelphia-New York Islanders Patrick Division Final.

In , Kelly, Reusch, and Bobby Taylor called the Calgary-St. Louis Campbell Conference Final series. CTV's coverage was blacked out in Calgary, where CBC provided coverage. The rights to the Calgary-Winnipeg series were eventually sold to the CTV affiliates in Calgary (CFCN) and Winnipeg (CKY) as well as Carling O'Keefe.

CBC and Molson Brewery used a loophole in that games involving Canadian based teams (excluding the Quebec Nordiques) in the playoffs could be televised locally by CBC.

Stanley Cup Finals coverage
In , Hockey Night in Canada moved all playoff coverage from CBC to CTV to avoid conflict with the lengthy NABET strike against the CBC. Eventually, MacLaren Advertising, in conjunction with Molson Breweries and Imperial Oil/Esso, who actually owned the rights to Hockey Night in Canada (not CBC) decided to give the playoff telecast rights to CTV. Initially, it was on a game by game basis in the quarterfinals (Game 1 of the Boston-Toronto series was seen on CFTO Toronto in full while other CTV affiliates, but not all joined the game in progress. Game 1 of the New York Rangers-Montreal series was seen only on CFCF Montreal while Game 4 not televised due to a lockout of technicians at the Montreal Forum), and then the full semifinals and Stanley Cup Finals. Because CTV did not have 100% penetration in Canada at this time, they asked CBC (who ultimately refused) to allow whatever one of their affiliates were the sole network in that market to show the playoffs. As a result, the 1972 Stanley Cup playoffs were not seen in some of the smaller Canadian markets unless said markets were close enough to the United States border to pick up the signal of a CBS affiliate that carried Games, 1, 4, or 6 (Games 2, 3 and 5 were not nationally broadcast in the United States).

In 1974, some CTV affiliates (like CFTO in Toronto and CFCF in Montreal) picked up the American feed from NBC (with Tim Ryan and Ted Lindsay on the call) of Game 4 of the Montreal-New York Rangers playoff series.

In , CBC televised Games 1 and 2 nationally while Games 3–5 were televised in Edmonton only. CTV televised Games 3–5 nationally while games were blacked out in Edmonton. Dan Kelly, Ron Reusch, and Brad Park called the games on CTV.

In , CBC only televised Games 1 and 2 in Montreal and Calgary. CBC televised Games 3–5 nationally. When CTV televised Games 1 and 2, both games were blacked out in Montreal and Calgary. Like in the year prior, Dan Kelly, Ron Reusch, and Brad Park called the games for CTV.

NHL-Soviet Super Series
In 1979–80, 1982–83, 1985–86, 1988–89, and 1989–90, CTV televised a handful of games of the NHL-Soviet Super Series, where touring Soviet clubs visited NHL teams in a series of exhibition games.

On New Year's Eve 1985, CTV broadcast one such game between the Montreal Canadiens and CSKA Moscow in Montreal. Although CTV aired the game (as a "Special Presentation of CTV Sports"), it was not considered an official part of NHL on CTV package. That was because the broadcast was presented by Molson instead of Carling O'Keefe. Therefore, a special on-air talent was utilized; Bob Cole, Ron Reusch, and Dick Irvin Jr. called the game while Dan Matheson and Brian McFarlane hosted the telecast together on CTV.

CTV's later involvement with the NHL

CTV Sportsnet's coverage

Sportsnet was launched on October 9, 1998 as CTV Sportsnet.  The name was chosen to match the regional "Fox Sports Net" operations across the United States. CTV owned 40% and was the managing partner of the new network; Rogers, Molson and Fox owned 20% each.

The new network gained credibility before it went on the air, wrestling the NHL Canadian cable package away from long-time holder TSN.  From 1998–99 until 2001–02, Sportsnet aired Labatt Blue Tuesday Night Hockey to a national audience throughout the regular season, and covered first-round playoff series not involving Canadian teams.  On the day CTV Sportsnet went on the air, its first live sports event was an NHL opening-night telecast between the Philadelphia Flyers and New York Rangers.  The national cable rights have since returned to TSN, though Sportsnet retains English regional rights to five of the seven Canadian-based clubs (TSN, through regional feeds, holds regional rights to the remaining two.)

"The Hockey Song" was used to open NHL broadcasts on CTV Sportsnet in the late 1990s and early 2000s.

Hockey Night in Canada rumours
The possible movement of Hockey Night in Canada to another broadcaster caused some controversy and discussion during the 2006–2007 hockey season. CTV had outbid the CBC for Canadian television rights to the 2010 and 2012 Olympics as well as the major television package for curling. The broadcast requirements would have focused on CTV-owned TSN (The Sports Network), a cable channel which already carries Canadian NHL hockey during the week as well as other NHL games throughout the season. CTV did, however, buy out the previous theme to CBC's Hockey Night in Canada for use in TSN's broadcasts immediately after the 2007–08 NHL season.

The CBC's deal with the NHL was set to expire after the 2013–14 season. CTV parent Bell had been expected to make a joint bid for CTV and sister network TSN for all national English-language television rights to the NHL in Canada. Under such a deal, CTV would likely have carried the Saturday-night games during the regular-season, weekend playoff games in the first three rounds, and the Stanley Cup Finals. TSN would likely have kept midweek national cable coverage of the league and gained midweek early round playoff games of Canadian-based teams now seen on CBC. Some midweek regular-season games could have been sub-leased to the various Rogers Sportsnet regional networks. Such a deal could also have put a few local midweek telecasts on CTV Two stations in Barrie (Toronto), Vancouver Island (Vancouver), Ottawa, Calgary, and Edmonton; along with CKY-TV Winnipeg and CFCF-TV Montreal.

But on November 26, 2013, the league announced that Rogers Communications had won all Canadian television rights to the league beginning with the 2014–15 season and extending through the 2025–26 season. While Rogers will sublease Saturday night and playoff games (including the Stanley Cup Finals) to CBC, thereby keeping that network's iconic Hockey Night in Canada in place until at least the 2017–18 season. However, Rogers will take over production of games. Rogers and CBC later renewed their partnership through the end of the 2025-26 season.

Thus, CTV, TSN, and their parent company will be out of NHL coverage until at least 2026 once some TSN regional agreements with some Canadian-based teams expire.

Announcers

Play-by-play
Bill Hewitt: 1972 Stanley Cup Finals 
Dan Kelly: 1984–1986

Color commentators
Bob Goldham: 1972 Stanley Cup Finals
Brian McFarlane: 1972 Stanley Cup Finals 
Ron Reusch: 1984–1986

Studio hosts
Dave Hodge: 1972 Stanley Cup Finals
Brian McFarlane: 1972 Stanley Cup Finals
Dan Matheson: 1984–1986

Studio analysts
John Garrett: 1985 playoffs (after Vancouver missed the playoffs). Garrett joined the CTV crew as studio analyst for the Canadiens-Nordiques Adams Division Final series. He retired before the start of the 1985–86 season, left CTV in October 1985, and joined CBC the following year.
Dave Maloney: 1985–86 season. Maloney joined the CTV crew as studio analyst and third-man in booth after Brad Park was hired mid-season to replace Harry Neale as head coach of the Red Wings, forcing him to leave CTV.
Brad Park: 1985 playoffs (after Detroit was eliminated). Park retired from playing in the summer of 1985 and joined the CTV crew as a studio analyst and "third man" in the booth for the 1985 Stanley Cup Finals and the 1985–86 season. However, he was hired mid-season to replace Harry Neale as head coach of the Red Wings, forcing him to leave CTV. He once again re-joined the crew for the 1986 playoffs, which Detroit did not qualify for.
Bobby Taylor: 1986 (whenever he is not on assignment with the Philadelphia Flyers). He joined the CTV crew as a studio analyst and "third man" in the booth in the 1986 playoffs after Philadelphia was eliminated.

References

External links
CTV.ca | CTV Sports
NHL on CTV - Google Search (timeline)
1984-85
1985-86
1986-87

CTV
CTV Television Network original programming
1980s Canadian sports television series
1984 Canadian television series debuts
1986 Canadian television series endings
CTV Sports